La sombra del otro is a Mexican telenovela produced by Televisa for Telesistema Mexicano in 1963.

Cast 
Aldo Monti
Luz María Aguilar
Alicia Montoya
Raquel Olmedo
Francisco Jambrina
Maruja Grifell
Jorge Mondragón
Fedora Capdevila
Eric del Castillo
Julio Monterde

References

External links 

Mexican telenovelas
1963 telenovelas
Televisa telenovelas
1963 Mexican television series debuts
1963 Mexican television series endings
Spanish-language telenovelas